John Beardsley (April 23, 1732 Shelton, Connecticut – August 23, 1809 Kingston, New Brunswick) was an Anglican priest in Canada.

A graduate of King's College, New York, he received ordination in England and returned in 1762 to serve congregations in Poughkeepsie, New York, and Fishkill, New York. In 1778, he served as chaplain to Beverley Robinson's Loyal American Regiment

Beardsley arrived in Canada as a loyalist. He is remembered as a loyalist cleric and father of freemasonry in New Brunswick.

References

External links 
 Biography at the Dictionary of Canadian Biography Online

1732 births
1809 deaths
American colonial clergy
Loyalists in the American Revolution from New York (state)
American Revolution chaplains
Anglican chaplains
British North American Anglicans
18th-century Canadian Anglican priests
Columbia College (New York) alumni
People from Kings County, New Brunswick
People from Poughkeepsie, New York
People from Shelton, Connecticut
United Empire Loyalists
People of colonial Connecticut
Columbia University alumni
Loyalists in the American Revolution from Connecticut